John Viney (1786/87 in London – 23 June 1856 in Herne Bay, Kent), was an English trunkmaker who operated from 122 Aldersgate Street, Saint Botolph, Aldersgate in the City of London, trading as Viney and Co Trunk Makers and later as John Viney and Son. John and Robert Viney were the sons of John and Mary Viney, and produced trunks sold to the East India Company for the use of the Army and Navy. In 1818 they lived at St. Paul's Church-yard.

 

 

 

The census of 6 June 1841 records John Viney as a trunk manufacturer living at Lambeth, Surrey and being 50–54 years old. The census of 30 March 1851 records him as a trunk manufacturer living at 2 Terrace, Camberwell, Surrey, married and age 64.

John Elliott Viney (1809–1906) became a partner in 1875 of Hazell, Watson and Viney Ltd, printers at Aylesbury.

The Viney premises were insured by Sun Fire Office on 16 April 1834.

Marriages and children
John Viney was first married to Elizabeth (1786–?) and had 4 children – Elizabeth Viney, Caroline Viney, Nicholas Viney and Richard Viney. His second marriage on 11 September 1811 at St Mildred in Bread Street, London, was to Elizabeth Elliott (1788–1861) and they had 6 children – Mary Elliott Viney (1812–1888), Josiah Viney (1816–1896) &1841 Anna Piper, Ebenezer Viney (1818–1891) &1848 Louisa Reynolds Johnson, John Viney (1819–1906) (presumably the John Elliott Viney (1809–1906) referred to above) & 1849 Elizabeth Ellen Poole &1858 Kezia Rooke &1863 Caroline Martha Priest, Emma Viney (1821–1888) and Samuel Viney (1826–1854).

Mary Elliott Viney recorded as a widow living at Clapton Common in Clapton on 25 February 1857.

References

External links
Victorian Trunk Makers

1780s births
1856 deaths
Luggage manufacturers